The men's skeleton at the 2002 Winter Olympics took place on 20 February, at the Utah Olympic Park.

Results

References

2002 men's skeleton results

Skeleton at the 2002 Winter Olympics
Men's events at the 2002 Winter Olympics